Hrair Simonian (born January 8, 1991) is an Armenian chess grandmaster. Simonian is a well seasoned blitz player, having reached the final of the Internet Chess Club Blitz Open tournament and drew Hikaru Nakamura in a match 3–3. In 2011, Simonian took joint first in the 72nd Armenian Chess Championship, he shared the title with Karen H. Grigoryan.

Notes

External links

Hrair Simonian chess games at 365Chess.com

Chess grandmasters
Armenian chess players
1991 births
Living people